William Ambrose Wright CBE (6 February 1924 – 3 September 1994), was an English footballer who played as a centre half. He spent his entire club career at Wolverhampton Wanderers. The first footballer in the world to earn 100 international caps, Wright also held the record for longest unbroken run in competitive international football, with 70 consecutive appearances, although that has since been surpassed by Antoine Griezmann's 74 consecutive appearances. He also made a total of 105 appearances for England, captaining them a record 90 times, including during their campaigns at the 1950, 1954 and 1958 World Cup finals.

Club career 
Wright was born at 33 Belmont Road, Ironbridge, Shropshire, his father Thomas was a worker at the Coalbrookdale Company ironworks. He was educated successively at Madeley Wood Methodist School and Madeley Modern School, playing outstandingly in the teams of both schools.

After playing during March–April that year for Cradley Heath in a dual player-groundsman role, his association with Wolves began in 1938 when, after being encouraged by his school teacher to respond to a newspaper advertisement inviting boys for trials, he was taken on as a member of their ground staff. He was only 14 years old when he made his debut for Wolves in a B team game against Walsall Wood in the Walsall Minor League.

He had been accepted on an eight-month trial by Major Frank Buckley, who initially told Wright he was "too small" but later changed his mind. He played his first match with the senior side in November 1939 in a friendly, in which a Wolves XI beat a Notts County XI 2-1 (League and Cup football had been suspended two months earlier due to the outbreak of World War II.)

His official debut came in the 1945–46 FA Cup in a two legged tie against Lovells Athletic.

Wright turned out as a guest for Leicester City, playing as both a forward and a defender before he returned to Molineux in 1942. A bad ankle break put his sporting career in doubt but he recovered, joined the army in 1943 as a physical training instructor, and played for Wolves whenever possible, making over 100 appearances in wartime football.

He became club captain soon after the end of the conflict, with the playing retirement of Stan Cullis. With Wright leading the team, they won the First Division title three times (1953–54, 1957–58 and 1958–59) as well as the FA Cup in 1949. He was a virtual ever-present, missing only 31 games for Wolves during the 1950s. He retired from playing in 1959, a year before Wolves won another FA Cup. He made a total of 541 appearances both at and away from Molineux for Wolves.

International career 

His performances for club saw him earn a call-up to the England team. His full debut came on 28 September 1946 in a thumping 7–2 win against Ireland. He was made captain in 1948, a role he held for 90 games until his retirement (an all-time record shared subsequently with Bobby Moore). In 1952, with his 42nd cap, he surpassed Bob Crompton's appearance record for England, which had stood since 1914. In total, he made 70 consecutive full international appearances with 105 in all, scoring three times. He was also the first footballer in the world to earn 100 caps, reaching the landmark in a 1-0 victory over Scotland at Wembley on 11 April 1959. It was more than a decade before his record was broken by another player, Bobby Charlton.

More than 60 years later, just eight other players, including Bobby Charlton and Bobby Moore, have made more appearances for the England side than Wright. His many appearances for England even outnumber the many appearances accumulated by the legendary likes of Bryan Robson, Kenny Sansom, Ray Wilkins, Kevin Keegan and Alan Shearer.

He retired as a player in August 1959.

Managerial career 
He became manager of England's youth team in 1960, before being appointed manager of Arsenal in 1962, replacing George Swindin. Initially Arsenal started strongly under Wright, finishing seventh in 1962–63 and qualifying for Europe for the first time in their history, but failed to build on this. Wright enjoyed mixed success with his signings, who included successes such as Bob Wilson, Joe Baker and Frank McLintock, but also less successful players such as Ian Ure.

Arsenal were unable to improve on their seventh in Wright's first season in charge, and their form gradually declined. Wright won only 38.46% of his matches in charge, the lowest rate for any post-war Arsenal manager (caretaker managers excepted). After a poor 1965–66 season – where Arsenal finished 14th and were knocked out of the FA Cup by Blackburn Rovers (who finished bottom of the First Division) — Wright was dismissed by the Arsenal board in the summer of 1966.

Football writer Brian Glanville, discussing Billy Wright's time at Arsenal, wrote: "he had neither the guile nor the authority to make things work and he reacted almost childishly to criticism".

Life after football 

Wright was a minor media personality, and his marriage to Joy Beverley of the Beverley Sisters occurred at a time long before the era of footballers being known for having celebrity girlfriends. This was in July 1958, by which time Wright was 34, and proved one of the most successful showbiz marriages.

After leaving Arsenal, Wright successfully overcame alcoholism and he later became a television pundit and Head of Sport for ATV and Central Television, before retiring in 1989. The following year, he joined the board of directors at Wolverhampton Wanderers as part of the takeover by Sir Jack Hayward.

On 7 August 1993, he presented Manchester United with the FA Charity Shield, which they won on penalties against Arsenal at Wembley Stadium. On 7 December that year he was present for the friendly game against Honved of Hungary which commemorated the re-opening of Molineux as a rebuilt 28,525-seat stadium. The redevelopment saw three new stands built at the stadium in the space of two years, with the one replacing the Waterloo Road Stand being designated the Billy Wright Stand.

Wright was the subject of This Is Your Life on two occasions: in May 1961 when he was surprised by Eamonn Andrews at the EMI Studios in London’s St John’s Wood, and in January 1990, when Michael Aspel surprised him at Thames Television's Teddington Studios.

Wright went on to be appointed a Commander of the Order of the British Empire on 13 June 1959.

Illness and death 
He died from pancreatic cancer on 3 September 1994, aged 70, having been diagnosed with the illness earlier in the year. He was cremated and his ashes were scattered on the pitch at Molineux.

Legacy 
In 2009, English football agent Bryan Yeubrey began a public campaign to obtain a posthumous knighthood for Wright. The campaign received support from several thousand fans and many former professional players.

In 2008, Midland Metro named an AnsaldoBreda T-69 tram in his honour.

Honours

As a player 
Wolverhampton Wanderers
First Division: 1953–54, 1957–58, 1958–59
FA Cup: 1948–49
FA Charity Shield: 1949, 1954

Individual 
FWA Footballer of the Year: 1952
Ballon d'Or runner-up: 1957
Commander of the Order of the British Empire: 1959
International Football Hall of Fame: 1997
Football League 100 Legends: 1998
Member of English Football Hall of Fame: 2002
Wolverhampton Wanderers FC Hall of Fame: 2009

Further reading 
Giller, Norman (2003) Billy Wright: A Hero for All Seasons,

See also 
 List of men's footballers with 100 or more international caps

References

External links 
Official Wolves site profile

English footballers
England international footballers
England wartime international footballers
English football managers
Arsenal F.C. managers
Wolverhampton Wanderers F.C. players
1950 FIFA World Cup players
1954 FIFA World Cup players
1958 FIFA World Cup players
Commanders of the Order of the British Empire
Deaths from pancreatic cancer
People from Ironbridge
Sportspeople from Shropshire
1924 births
1994 deaths
Military personnel from Shropshire
FIFA Century Club
English Football League players
Wolverhampton Wanderers F.C. directors and chairmen
English Football Hall of Fame inductees
Deaths from cancer in England
English Football League representative players
Association football defenders
British Army personnel of World War II
Royal Army Physical Training Corps soldiers
FA Cup Final players